The Sunderland Symphony Orchestra is a semi-professional symphony orchestra based in Sunderland, England. The orchestra was formed after an initiative by the Sunderland City Council. The council wished to commemorate the Millennium, and allocate funds to each ward for this purpose.

John Lennox, Winifred Lundgren and Mark Greenfield, the three councillors for the Thornholme Ward, had the vision of forming an orchestra as a long-term commemoration of the Millennium. A public meeting was called on 1 October, 1999 where it was decided to form ‘The City of Sunderland Millennium Orchestral Society’ (CoSMOS), with the aim of forming a symphony orchestra. The musicians at that first meeting formed the core membership of the new orchestra.

Rupert Hanson was appointed musical director and principal conductor, and he developed the orchestra in consultation with the society members.
 
The new society later became a registered charity, and since other musical activities did not materialise, the name of the charity was changed to ‘Sunderland Symphony Orchestra’ in 2006. Following the death of Rupert Hanson in August 2009, Mun Ying Lin was appointed interim musical director until Ray Farr was appointed as the new Musical Director and Principal Conductor in November 2009. After four years in the post, Ray Farr moved on to become Associate Conductor with the Grimethorpe Colliery Band and was succeeded by Paul Judson, a founder member of the orchestra, in January 2014. Paul stood down as Musical Director in July 2018, following his having developed hearing problems, and the position of Musical Director and Principal Conductor was taken over by David Milner. Paul continued to play bassoon in the orchestra and has been appointed Deputy Conductor, as well as made an Honorary Member of the orchestra.

David McCourt was a leader of the orchestra until September 2012, when Judith Thompson took over the position. David then played cello with the orchestra for a short time.

The orchestra performed its first full symphony – Dvořák's 9th (The "New World Symphony") – on 7 April 2001.

The orchestra gives four concerts a year, usually held in the West Park United Reformed Church, Stockton Road, Sunderland SR2 7AQ, (opposite Park Lane Transport Interchange and Metro). The building became privately owned in March 2018, but continues to be known as West Park Church, and the orchestra remains in residence. Performances have also been given at the Sunderland Empire Theatre, the Sage Gateshead and the Stadium of Light.

References

External links
 SSO official website

British symphony orchestras
Music in Tyne and Wear
Musical groups established in 2000
Musical groups from Sunderland
2000 establishments in England